Autoroute 15 may refer to:
 A15 autoroute, in France
 Quebec Autoroute 15, in Quebec, Canada

See also 
 List of A15 roads
 List of highways numbered 15